Coleman is a small unincorporated community and census-designated place in Johnston County, Oklahoma, United States. The town was previously known as Ego, which was the name assigned to the post office when it was established in 1895. The post office name was officially changed to "Coleman" on September 10, 1910 due to a tornado that destroyed the town. The Census Bureau defined a census-designated place (CDP) for Coleman in 2015; the 2010 population within the 2015 CDP boundary is 319 and contains 154 housing units. Coleman has its own schooling system and a bank plus 2 general stores.

Demographics

Notable person
John H. Ross, World War II pilot awarded the Distinguished Flying Cross twice, and subject of the documentary film John Ross: American

References

Sources
 Shirk, George H. Oklahoma Place Names. Norman, Oklahoma: University of Oklahoma Press, 1965.

Unincorporated communities in Johnston County, Oklahoma
Unincorporated communities in Oklahoma
Census-designated places in Johnston County, Oklahoma
Census-designated places in Oklahoma